Goran Gavrančić (Serbian Cyrillic: Горан Гавранчић; born 2 August 1978) is a former Serbian professional footballer who played as a defender.

He represented Serbia and Montenegro at the 2006 FIFA World Cup.

Club career
His career began at Čukarički, having played for Red Star Belgrade as a youth. His performances at Čukarički caught the eye of Dynamo Kyiv manager Valeriy Lobanovskyi and the Ukrainian club purchased him in January 2001. In January 2008, he joined on a six-month loan deal with PAOK.

After six months without club, he signed a one-year contract with Partizan on 17 January 2009. He signed for Henan Construction in January 2010. In September 2010, he announced his retirement from professional football due to the prolonged problems with injuries.

International career
Gavrančić was part of the Serbia and Montenegro national team's "Famous Four" defence, alongside Mladen Krstajić, Ivica Dragutinović and Nemanja Vidić, that conceded just one goal during the ten 2006 FIFA World Cup qualification matches, setting a new record for the fewest goals conceded.

International statistics

Honours
Dynamo Kyiv
 Ukrainian Premier League: 2000–01, 2002–03, 2003–04, 2006–07
 Ukrainian Cup: 2002–03, 2004–05, 2005–06, 2006–07
 Ukrainian Super Cup: 2004, 2006, 2007
Partizan
 Serbian SuperLiga: 2008–09
 Serbian Cup: 2008–09

References

External links
 Reprezentacija profile

1978 births
Living people
Footballers from Belgrade
Serbian footballers
Association football defenders
Serbia and Montenegro international footballers
2006 FIFA World Cup players
FK Čukarički players
FK Partizan players
Serbian SuperLiga players
FC Dynamo Kyiv players
Ukrainian Premier League players
PAOK FC players
Super League Greece players
Henan Songshan Longmen F.C. players
Chinese Super League players
Serbia and Montenegro expatriate footballers
Serbia and Montenegro footballers
Serbian expatriate footballers
Expatriate footballers in Ukraine
Serbia and Montenegro expatriate sportspeople in Ukraine
Serbian expatriate sportspeople in Ukraine
Expatriate footballers in Greece
Serbian expatriate sportspeople in Greece
Expatriate footballers in China
Serbian expatriate sportspeople in China